Aleksandr Vasilyevich Novikov (born 14 June 1955) is a Russian football coach and a former Soviet and Russian player. He works at the academy of FC Dynamo Moscow.

Honours
 Soviet Top League winner: 1976 (spring).
 Soviet Top League runner-up: 1986.
 Soviet Cup winner: 1977, 1984.
 Russian Premier League runner-up (as a manager): 1992.
 All-time most league appearances for FC Dynamo Moscow: 395.

International career
Novikov made his debut for USSR on 20 March 1977 in a friendly against Tunisia. He played in a 1978 FIFA World Cup qualifier.

Personal life
His son Kirill Novikov played football professionally as well, and then became a coach. In 2019, Kirill was appointed manager of FC Dynamo Moscow, with Aleksandr working as his assistant.

External links 
  Profile

1955 births
Living people
Soviet footballers
Soviet Union international footballers
Russian football managers
Russian footballers
Soviet Top League players
FC Dynamo Moscow players
FC Dynamo Stavropol players
FC Spartak Vladikavkaz players
Footballers from Moscow
FC Spartak Vladikavkaz managers
FC Dynamo Moscow managers
Russian Premier League managers
Association football defenders